Richard Strauss composed his Cello Sonata in F major, Op. 6, TrV 115, in 1883 when he was 19 years old. It was dedicated to the Czech cellist Hanuš Wihan, who gave the premiere in 1883. It rapidly became a standard part of the cello repertoire.

Composition history

Strauss completed the first version of the Cello Sonata on 5 May 1881. His sister Johanna was a good friend of Dora Wihan, a talented pianist and wife of the cellist Hanuš Wihan (he was known by the first name Hans in Germany), who played in the Munich Court orchestra along with Richard's father Franz. "Through these relationships, Strauss came to know Wihan and his instrument's idiomatic possibilities". He composed and dedicated the sonata for "his dear friend" (Seinem lieben Freunde) Hans Wihan. On the first manuscript, he added a verse by Austrian poet Franz Grillparzer:

In March 1883 he revised the sonata into its current form, notably replacing the original finale with a completely new one. The sonata is in the traditional three movements:

 Allegro con brio
 Andante ma non troppo.
 Finale - Allegro vivo.

Norman Del Mar wrote that "...the influence of Mendelssohn is strongly marked. The opening of the sonata has a fine verve and Strauss wrote proudly home to his parents that the celebrated violinist Joseph Joachim had congratulated him" Strauss had met Joachim at an evening concert on 16 January at Berlin where they shared the stage: Strauss had accompanied Robert Hausmann in the Cello Sonata, and Joachim continued with the Beethoven Romance in G and Bach's Chaconne from the D minor Partita.

Performances

The premiere was given on 6 December 1883 in Nuremberg, by Hans Wihan and pianist Hildergard von Koenigs.  On 19 December of the same year, while visiting Dresden, Strauss accompanied the principal cellist of the Dresden Court Orchestra, Ferdinand Böckmann. Oscar Franz, a horn player in the orchestra, reported to Franz Strauss: Your son's wonderful sonata had a magnificent reception and is indeed a splendid work, full of original feeling, and everything flows so wholesomely from it. I take the greatest pleasure in your son's success.

Willi Schuh notes that "Of all the works from this period of Strauss's creative life, the Cello Sonata is still the one that is heard most often", and that "This sonata quickly became one of Strauss's most frequently performed works". Strauss himself accompanied the sonata on several occasions later in his life: including concerts at Leipzig on 31 March 1890 (Alvin Schröder on Cello)), New York on 18 March 1904 (Leo Schulz) and Manchester (UK) on 21 December 1904 (Carl Fuchs).

Romanze for cello and orchestra 

About the same time as Strauss wrote the Sonata, he also wrote a single movement Romanze for cello and orchestra. Norman Del Mar wrote:  A further composition for the Cello, though this time with orchestral accompaniment, also belongs to this period, a most attractive Romanze which has unfortunately remained unpublished. It is a gentle 3/8 movement, similar in type to the slow movements of the violin and Horn concertos, both of which precede by date of composition.

The piece was completed on 17 June 1883, and was performed a few times by Hans Wihan, who premiered it on 15 February 1884 at Baden-Baden and went on to perform it in Aachen, Freiburg, and elsewhere It was dedicated to Anton Ritter von Knözinger. The piece somehow came to be forgotten, but was eventually published by Schott in 1987. It was first performed in modern times by cellist Jan Vogler, with the Orchestra of the Dresden Semperoper conducted by Günter Neuhold on 12 May 1986. The orchestra is double woodwind, two horns and strings. The piece takes about 10 minutes to perform.

There is also an abridged (shortened) version of the Romanze for Cello with piano accompaniment, which Strauss dedicated to Ferdinand Böckmann (principal cellist in the Dresden Court Orchestra).  This is about one third of the length "and also shows numerous deviations from the original orchestral version". Many copies of this version have survived, indicating its popularity at the time. Whether Wihan used a piano arrangement of the orchestral version or the abridged version "it is no longer possible to say". The abridged version was first performed in modern times by Peter Wöpke on cello accompanied by Wolfgang Sawallisch on 17 October 1985 in Munich.

The Dora Wihan-Weis affair

Richard Strauss became close to Dora, who was four years older than him. Sister Johanna Strauss wrote of Dora, "She was like one of the family. Herr Wihan was insanely jealous over this pretty and already rather coquettish wife. I often witnessed scenes. When Richard was with us, we used to make music. She was very musical and an excellent piano player". The marriage ended in divorce after a few years. Hans left to become a Professor at the Prague Conservatory and going on to found the celebrated Bohemian Quartet and later worked with Antonín Dvořák on his Cello Concerto in B minor. Dora and Richard developed a deep understanding and whole-hearted liking, and "there can be no doubt that they were in love for some years". Dora kept a photograph of Richard (inscribed To his beloved and only one, R) on her piano until she died in 1938.  They wrote many letters to each other, which she ordered be destroyed on her death.  Strauss also destroyed her letters to him: possibly because of his jealous wife Pauline de Ahna whom he married in 1894. There was a lot of gossip in Munich, and when Richard moved to Meiningen his father warned him of the need to preserve a spotless reputation: "Don't forget how people here talked about you and Dora W." There is one surviving letter from Richard to Dora, written in 1889: "The fact is, that your letter, putting off the prospect of seeing you again for the foreseeable future, has upset and distressed me deeply. God, what wooden expressions those are for what I really feel...Strauss the artist is doing very well! But may no happiness be complete?!"

In January 1911, they met again under difficult circumstances in Dresden. Dora was the co-repetiteur at the rehearsals for the premiere of Der Rosenkavalier. Strauss gave her a signed copy of the vocal score. Sister Johanna was delighted to meet her old friend, inviting her to dinner with the family. Wife "Pauline was furious and treated Dora like a rival. Richard, as always, took his wife's part, and there was no further contact between them". In his notebook, there is a cryptic entry on 9 March 1911 "Letter to Hanna (his sister, Johanna) concerning D.Wihan" (Brief an Hanna weg D.Wihan). On 31 January 1938 he made the entry "Dora Wihan-Weis deceased".

Recordings 
The first recording of the sonata was made by Raya Garbousova with pianist Erich Itor Kahn, issued as part of the Concert Hall Society Limited Edition Records in 1948-9 (reference C14, consisting of three 78rpm records), which is not at present available. There is a recording from December 1953 at the Beethoven-Saal, Hanover with Ludwig Hoelscher and pianist Hans Richter-Haaser. Another historic recording was made on 28 September 1966, with cellist Gregor Piatigorsky and Leonard Pennario, at the Webster Hall, New York issued on RCA Victor. There are many recordings currently available, which include:

The Romanze has been recorded many times with orchestra or piano since it was published in 1987/8, and is often released alongside the Cello sonata. The recordings with an asterisk * before the titles above include the Romanze. There are some recordings that only have the Romanze with orchestral accompaniment, including:

{| class="wikitable"
!bgcolor=ececec|CD title and release date
!bgcolor=ececec|Performers - (Cello, conductor, orchestra)
!bgcolor=ececec|Label and reference
|-
|Strauss - Orchestral Works (2003)
|Thomas Grossenbacher, David Zinman, Tonhalle Orchestra
|Arte Nova: 74321984952
|-
|Strauss, R: Symphony No. 2, Op. 12, etc.(2004)
|Raphael Wallfisch, Neeme Järvi, Royal Scottish National Orchestra
|Chandos: CHAN10236X
|-
|Shostakovich: Cello Concertos (2001)
|Arto Noras, Ari Rasilainen, Norwegian Radio Orchestra
|Apex: 0927406042
|-
|Strauss: Don Quixote and Romanze for Cello (2000)
|Alexander Rudin, Gerhard Markson, Ireland National Symphony Orchestra
|Naxos: 8554175
|}

References

General sources

Del Mar, Norman, Richard Strauss: A critical commentary on his life and works, Volume 1. Faber and Faber, London, second edition 1985, .
Schuh, Willi (1982). Richard Strauss: A Chronicle of the Early Years 1864-1898, (translated by Mary Wittal), Cambridge University Press. .
Trenner, Franz. Richard Strauss Chronik, Verlag Dr Richard Strauss Gmbh, Wien, 2003. .
Warfield, Scott (2003), "From "Too Many Works" to "Wrist Exercises": The Abstract Instrumental Compositions of Richard Strauss", Chapter 6 in Mark-Daniel Schmid (editor) The Richard Strauss Companion, Praeger, Westport Connecticut, London. .
Wilhelm, Kurt (1989). Richard Strauss: An Intimate Portrait''. London: Thames & Hudson. .

External links
Cello Sonata, 1st movement, Raya Garbousova and Erich-Itor Kahn.
Romanze for Cello and Orchestra, Emmanuelle Bertrand with the Flanders Symphony Orchestra conducted by Jan Latham-Koenig.

Chamber music by Richard Strauss
Strauss
1883 compositions
Compositions in F major
Music with dedications